Rogue River Indians are a conglomeration of many tribal groups in the Rogue River Valley area, belonging to three language families: Athabascan, Takelma, and Shastan.

Groups
The principal tribes grouped under the name Rogue River Indians were: 
 Lower Rogue River Athabascan (or Tututni) tribes, including: 
 Upper Coquille (Mishikwutinetunne, Mishi-qute-me-tunne - ″the people dwelling on the river Mishi″) tribe (Coquille River Area), 
 Shasta Costa tribe, and 
 Tututni tribe (Lower Rogue River Area) (including Yukichetunne or (Yugweeche, Eu-qua-chees) band (Euchre Creek Area)) and 
 Upper  Rogue River Athabascan (Siskiyou: Galice-Applegate) tribes, including: 
 Taltushtuntede, Taltushtuntude or (Tal-tuc-tun-te-de) tribe (Galice Creek Area) and 
 Dakubetede (Da-ku-be-te-de) tribe (Applegate Area),
 Takelman tribes, including:
 Latgawa (Upland Takelma), 
 Takelma (Dagelma) (Lowland or River Takelma), 
 Shasta (Chasta).

The total estimated population of these tribes in 1850 was about 9,500. The French Canadian employees of the Hudson's Bay Company called them all "coquins", meaning "Rogues", where the designation Rogue River comes from.

After the Rogue River Wars in 1856, bands of the Rogue River Indians were split between the Confederated Tribes of Siletz and the Confederated Tribes of the Grand Ronde Community of Oregon, relocating to either the Siletz Indian Reservation north of the tribe's traditional lands or to the Grand Ronde Indian Reservation. Some of the tribal members were never captured and were forced to wander.

Notes

References
 E.A. Schwartz, The Rogue River indian War and Its Aftermath, 1850-1980. Norman, OK: University of Oklahoma Press, 1997.

Native American tribes in Oregon
Confederated Tribes of Siletz Indians
i01